Daniel Corral (born 1981) is an American composer and musician.

Biography
Corral was born in Eagle River, Alaska, United States, in 1981. He holds an M.F.A. in music from the California Institute of the Arts (2007) and a B.M. from the University of Puget Sound (2004). While at Calarts he studied composition with Anne LeBaron and James Tenney. His musical voice finds outlet in puppet operas, accordion orchestras, handmade music boxes, player pianos, electronic collages, site-specific installations, chamber music, and interdisciplinary collaborations.

The Los Angeles Times described the premiere at Zipper Hall of his Sigils for solo piano as "the recital's strongest piece. Sigils boasts a fascinating -- and somewhat split -- personality, with its mixtures of rhythmic data-dancing systems and more visceral, clustered fistfuls-of-notes, hazy keyboard cloud activity, and a deceptive 'resolving chord' (with a flatted second in the bass)".
 
His second puppet opera, Zoophilic Follies, premiered September 2011 at REDCAT and featured Timur and the Dime Museum along with other musical guests. His first puppet opera, Le Petit Macabre, premiered in 2008 at St. Anne's Warehouse, Brooklyn as part of the Great Small Works Toy Theatre Festival. It was inspired by Gyorgy Ligeti's opera, Le Grand Macabre.

He also composes, arranges, and plays accordion/electronics in Timur and the Dime Museum, a music ensemble featuring operatic tenor Timur Bekbosunov, clarinetist Brian Walsh, violist Cassia Streb, guitarist Matthew Setzer, bassist David Tranchina, and drummer Andrew Lessman.

References

External links
Daniel Corral's official site

1981 births
21st-century American composers
21st-century classical composers
American classical composers
American classical musicians
American male classical composers
Living people
Date of birth missing (living people)
21st-century American male musicians